(The) Flying Frenchman may refer to:

 Cosmic Wind Flying Frenchman, an aircraft; see List of aircraft (Co–Cz)
 "The Flying Frenchman", a solo recital performed by Andrew Ling
 The Flying Frenchman, a bronze sculpture by César Baldaccini in Hong Kong
 Flying Frenchman (nickname), a nickname

See also

 Flying Dutchman (disambiguation)
 Frenchman (disambiguation)
 Flying (disambiguation)